Scot MacDonald (born 15 February 1961) is an Australian politician. He was a Liberal Party member of the New South Wales Legislative Council from 2011 to 2019.

MacDonald holds a Bachelor of Financial Administration and a Masters of Environmental Management from the University of New England.

Prior to NSW Parliament, MacDonald was an Executive Officer at Riverina Citrus.

He also served on the State Executive of the NSW Liberal Party for 10 years as Country Vice-President.

He was a member of numerous committees including GPSC5 which is notable for its Inquiry into Coal Seam Gas. He has also served on a wide range of Inquries, such as the Management of Public Lands, Corrective Services, Racial Vilification, and Valuer General.

MacDonald is a member of the Institute of Public Affairs and a strong advocate of free trade.

References

Liberal Party of Australia members of the Parliament of New South Wales
1961 births
Living people
Members of the New South Wales Legislative Council
21st-century Australian politicians